Give Up is an EP by the English indie rock musician Miles Kane. It was released on 21 February 2013.

Track listing

Chart performance

Release history

References 

2013 EPs
Sony Music EPs
Miles Kane albums
albums produced by Ian Broudie